Louise Versavel (born 29 April 1995) is a Belgian female field hockey player who currently plays as an attacker for the Belgium women's national field hockey team.

She has represented Belgium in few international competitions including the 2012-13 Women's FIH Hockey World League and the 2018 Women's Hockey World Cup.

She was also one of the key members of the Belgian team which emerged as runners-up to world champions Netherlands at the 2017 Women's EuroHockey Nations Championship.

2018 World Cup
She was part of the Belgian squad during the 2018 Women's Hockey World Cup which crashed out of the second round after a penalty shootout defeat against Spain following a goalless full time finish. However, she was the top goalscorer for Belgium during the World Cup campaign with 4 goals and importantly scored 2 goals in the penalty shootout defeat.

References

External links 
 

1995 births
Living people
Belgian female field hockey players
Female field hockey forwards